was a Japanese economist, educator and Christian pacifist. The first director of Shakai Kagaku Kenkyūjo (Institute of Social Science or Shaken) at the University of Tokyo, he studied at Toynbee Hall and School of Economics and Political Science (London School of Economics).

Life 
Born in Ehime Prefecture, Yanaihara became a Christian under the influence of Uchimura Kanzō's Mukyokai or Nonchurch Movement, while he was studying at the University of Tokyo after he graduated from Hyogo Prefectural Kobe Junior High School（predecessor of Hyogo Prefectural Kobe High School ) and First Higher School. In the 1930s he was appointed to the chair of colonial studies at the University of Tokyo, formerly held by his teacher Nitobe Inazō. However, Yanaihara's pacifist views and emphasis on indigenous self-determination, which he partly inherited from  Nitobe –  a Quaker and founding member of the League of Nations – came into a full conflict with Japan's wartime government during World War II. He was noted for his criticism of Japan's expansionist policies. As a result, Yanaihara was forced to resign from teaching under pressure by right-wing scholars in 1937. Yanaihara resumed his teaching after the war and taught international economics at the University of Tokyo. He served as the president of the University from 1951 to 1957. 

For critical studies of Yanaihara's legacy, see Yanaihara Tadao and Japanese Colonial Policy: Redeeming Empire, by Susan C. Townsend (Richmond: Curzon, 2000); and The Japanese Colonial Empire, 1895-1945, edited by Ramon H. Myers and Mark R. Peattie (Princeton: Princeton U.P., 1984).

Support for Zionism 
Yanaihara was interested in supporting and promoting Zionist forms of settler colonialism as a model that Japan could emulate. "The Zionist movement," claimed Yanaihara, "is nothing more than an attempt to secure the right for Jews to migrate and colonize in order to establish a center for Jewish national culture." As Japan's colonialist expansion gained speed in Manchuria and Korea in the 1920s and 1930s, the Japanese government and especially the Manchukuo government showed interest in cooperative agricultural settlement similar to what scholars like Yanaihara documented in Palestine.

Shokumin 
He used the term shokumin (population migration) to discuss colonization and migration, highlighting the qualities of migration for the creation of a global civil society.

Awards 
 senior grade of the third court rank
 Grand Cordon in the Order of the Sacred Treasure

References

Biography 
 
 Nakano, Ryoko (2013). Beyond the Western Liberal Order: Yanaihara Tadao and Empire as Society. Palgrave. 
 ''Tadao, Yanaihara  Zenshu (Complete Works of Tadao Yanaihara), 29 vols. Tokyo: Iwanami Shoten, 1963-65.

External links 
 YANAIHARA TADAO AND JAPANESE COLONIAL EMPIRE｜A moral beacon in Japan's darkest days｜The Japan Times

1893 births
1961 deaths
People from Ehime Prefecture
University of Tokyo alumni
Academic staff of the University of Tokyo
Presidents of the University of Tokyo
Japanese economists
Historians of colonialism
Japanese Christians
Japanese Christian pacifists
Japanese Protestants
Presidents of The Japan Association of National Universities